Thomas Pressly is an American attorney and politician serving as a member of the Louisiana House of Representatives from the 6th district. Elected in November 2019, he assumed office on January 13, 2020.

Education 
Pressly graduated from C. E. Byrd High School in 2005. He earned a Bachelor of Science degree from Texas Christian University in 2009 and a Juris Doctor from the Loyola University New Orleans College of Law in 2013.

Career 
In 2013 and 2014, Pressley served as a law clerk for S. Maurice Hicks Jr. He has since worked as a civil litigation attorney. He was elected to the Louisiana House of Representatives in November 2019 and assumed office on January 13, 2020.

References 

Living people
C. E. Byrd High School alumni
Texas Christian University alumni
Loyola University New Orleans College of Law alumni
Louisiana lawyers
Republican Party members of the Louisiana House of Representatives
Year of birth missing (living people)